Women's Prison (Spanish: Cárcel de mujeres) is a 1951 Mexican drama film directed by Miguel M. Delgado and starring Miroslava, Sara Montiel and Katy Jurado. The film's sets were designed by the art director Gunther Gerszo.

Cast
 Miroslava as Evangelina  
 Sara Montiel as Dora  
 Katy Jurado as Lupe  
 María Douglas as La Mayora  
 Mercedes Soler as Rosa 
 Elda Peralta as Prisionera  
 Emma Roldán as Petrona  
 Eufrosina García as La Chicle  
 Pepita Morillo as Prisionera rubia  
 Gloria Morel as Gloria, prisionera  
 María Gentil Arcos as Guardia  
 Luis Beristáin as Júlio  
 Eduardo Alcaraz as Teniente  
 Miguel Manzano as Doctor 
 Tito Junco as Alberto Suárez 
 Lupe Carriles as Esther, prisionera  
 Lidia Franco as Guardia  
 Eva Garza as Cantante  
 Leonor Gómez as Prisionera  
 Ana María Hernández as Visitadora  
 Elodia Hernández as Guardia  
 Isabel Herrera as Prisionera  
 Ángel Infante as Esposo de Gloria  
 Cecilia Leger as Guardia  
 Carmen Manzano as Enfermera  
 Blanca Marroquín as Prisionera  
 Arturo Martín del Campo 
 Kika Meyer as Prisionera en biblioteca  
 Inés Murillo as Prisionera  
 José Pardavé as Taxista  
 Salvador Quiroz as Vigilante de Prison  
 Isabel Vázquez 'La Chichimeca' as  Prisionera

References

Bibliography 
 Mira, Alberto. Historical Dictionary of Spanish Cinema. Scarecrow Press, 2010.

External links 
 

1951 films
1951 drama films
Mexican drama films
1950s Spanish-language films
1950s prison films
Films directed by Miguel M. Delgado
Mexican black-and-white films
1950s Mexican films